The 1936–37 Hong Kong First Division League season was the 29th since its establishment.

League table

References
1936–37 Hong Kong First Division table (RSSSF)
香港倒後鏡blog

Hong Kong First Division League seasons
Hong
First